The National Herb Centre is a herbarium and garden centre located in Warmington, Warwickshire, England.  The centre was opened in 1997 by Peter Turner, former Chairman of the British Herb Trade Association. As well as being a place of research and learning there is a cafe, bistro, shops and a nature trail. Guided tours are available in the summer and there is no charge to visit the centre.

References

External links
 The Centre's website

Herbaria in the United Kingdom
1997 establishments in England
Companies established in 1997
Stratford-on-Avon District